Acroclita catharotorna is a moth of the family Tortricidae. It is found in China (Tianjin, Shanghai, Zhejiang, Hunan), Taiwan and Japan.

The wingspan is about 12 mm.

References

Moths described in 1935
Eucosmini
Moths of Asia